The 2009 IIHF Division I World Championship was an ice hockey tournament under the authority of the International Ice Hockey Federation. It was contested from April 11–17, 2009. The tournament was played amongst two separate groups. Group A's tournament was held in Vilnius, Lithuania. The Group B games was hosted by Toruń, Poland.

Participants

Group A 
Group A was contested in  Vilnius.

Group B 
Group B was contested in  Toruń.

Group A Tournament

Fixtures
All times local.

Standings

Group B Tournament

Fixtures
All times local.

Note: OT indicates that the game was won in overtime. SO indicates that the game was won through a shootout.

Standings

References

External links 
Group A fixtures and statistics at the IIHF
Group B fixtures and statistics at the IIHF

IIHF World Championship Division I
2
2009 in Lithuanian sport
International ice hockey competitions hosted by Lithuania
Sports competitions in Vilnius
World
World
2009
Ice hockey
21st century in Vilnius
April 2009 sports events in Europe